Patricia Gastaud-Gallagher was a director at the Académie du Vin, a impetus, with Steven Spurrier, behind the 1976 Judgment of Paris wine tasting event and participated as one of its eleven judges. She was also on the Copia panel that oversaw the rematch on The Judgment of Paris 30th Anniversary. She is one of the few non-French natives to have won the distinguished Chevalier du Mérite Agricole given for distinguished service to the French Wine industry. She was also academic director and director of the wine department of the famous LE CORDON BLEU school of cuisine and pastry. She is a co-author of the book Le Cordon Bleu Wine Essentials: Professional Secrets to Buying, Storing, Serving, and Drinking Wine.
Patricia is featured in the film 'Judgement of Paris' set to premiere on SOMM TV in May 2022, from the creators of the Somm (film) series, to tell the true story of the 1976 wine tasting.

See also 
 List of wine personalities

Citations

References

External links
Tasted 30 years later: They're alive! A rematch of the historic 1976 Paris event proves California reds age gracefully, as they topple French classics.

Wine critics
Living people
Year of birth missing (living people)
Knights of the Order of Agricultural Merit